Exidiopsis macroacantha is a species of fungus in the family Auriculariaceae. Originally found in São Paulo State, Brazil, where it was growing on rotting wood, it was described as new to science in 1969 by U.S. mycologist Kenneth Wells. It has also been recorded in Costa Rica. The specific epithet macroacantha, derived from the Greek words macro ("long") and acantha ("spine"), refers to the characteristically long and thick-walled cystidia.

References

External links

Auriculariales
Fungi described in 1969
Fungi of Central America
Fungi of Brazil